Lilen is a village in the Peren district of Nagaland, India. It is located in the Athibung Circle.

Demographics 

According to the 2011 census of India, Lilen has 168 households. The literacy rate of the village is 64.91%.

References 

Villages in Ahthibung Circle